The Tuglow River, a perennial river that is part of the Hawkesbury-Nepean catchment, is located in the Central Tablelands region of New South Wales, Australia.

Course and features
The Tuglow River rises on the eastern slopes of the Great Dividing Range south of Shooters Hill, and flows generally south southeast and then northeast, before reaching its confluence with the Kowmung River, near its junction with the Hollanders River. The river descends  over its  course.

In its lower reaches, the river adjoins Nattai National Park.

See also 

 List of rivers of Australia
 List of rivers of New South Wales (L–Z)
 Rivers of New South Wales

References 

Rivers of New South Wales
Central Tablelands